Jerry Allan Holland (born August 25, 1954) is a Canadian retired ice hockey winger who played 37 games in the National Hockey League (NHL) for the New York Rangers.

Career 
Holland was selected by the Rangers in the third round (50th overall) of the 1974 NHL amateur draft and by the Cincinnati Stingers of the World Hockey Association (WHA) in the second round (21st overall) of the 1974 WHA Amateur Draft.

Playing for the Providence Reds in the 1974–1975 AHL season, Holland was awarded the Dudley "Red" Garrett Memorial Award for Outstanding Rookie of the Year.

Career statistics

References

External links
 

1954 births
Living people
Calgary Centennials players
Canadian expatriate ice hockey players in the United States
Canadian ice hockey left wingers
Cincinnati Stingers draft picks
Edmonton Oilers (WHA) players
Ice hockey people from Alberta
Kamloops Rockets players
New Haven Nighthawks players
New York Rangers draft picks
New York Rangers players
People from the County of Grande Prairie No. 1
Providence Reds players
Salt Lake Golden Eagles (CHL) players